Outlaw Golf is a series of golf video games developed by Hypnotix, that are intended for adults and mature teens. Outlaw Golf was released for the Xbox on June 11, 2002; for GameCube on October 30, 2002; and for Microsoft Windows on September 30, 2003. A standalone expansion, Outlaw Golf: Holiday Golf was released December 23, 2002. A second standalone expansion, Outlaw Golf: 9 More Holes of X-Mas, was released November 15, 2003. An official sequel, Outlaw Golf 2, was released for Xbox on October 21, 2004 and for PlayStation 2 on November 25, 2004. The games are part of the Outlaw series, and other titles include Outlaw Volleyball and Outlaw Tennis. The Xbox version was released in Japan as part of Xbox World Collection series.

Gameplay

Outlaw Golf supports single player and multiplayer with 1-4 players, and Outlaw Golf 2 supports single player, online and offline multiplayer with 1-4 players. Players take control one of several characters, each with their own unique caddy. The series is noted for its crude humor, particularly in regard to the characters, most of whom fall under an exaggerated archetype. These include a stripper, a hippie, a biker, and more. Unique to the series is the Composure Meter. As players do well, the player character's composure meter increases. The maximum distance rating for each club increases or decreases in relation to the player character's composure. This is designed to simulate frustration: the more shots missed, the more frustrated the player character gets and the worse they perform. In order to counteract this, the player character can beat or humiliate their caddy in some way, which raises the composure meter. Hitting a perfect shot results in the ball bursting into flames as it travels; the flames extinguishing when the turn is over. Outlaw Golf 2 includes new courses and additional golfers and caddies.

Actor and comedian Steve Carell provides the commentator track for the original Outlaw Golf, and comedian Dave Attell takes over announcing duties in Outlaw Golf 2.

Reception

Outlaw Golf

The GameCube and Xbox versions of Outlaw Golf received "average" reviews according to video game review aggregator Metacritic.

Outlaw Golf 2

The sequel received "mixed or average reviews" on both platforms according to video game review aggregator Metacritic.

References

External links

2004 video games
PlayStation 2 games
Golf video games
Xbox games
Take-Two Interactive franchises
GameCube games
Windows games
2002 video games
Video games developed in the United States
Video games featuring female protagonists
RenderWare games
TDK Mediactive games
Multiplayer and single-player video games
Simon & Schuster Interactive games